Peter Matthews (born 13 November 1989) is a Jamaican sprinter specialising in the 400 metres. He is an Olympic silver medalist as a member of the Jamaican 4 × 400 m relay team in Rio.  He competed at the 2015 World Championships in Beijing reaching the semifinals. In addition, he won the silver medal at the 2011 Summer Universiade.

His personal best in the event is 44.69 set in the qualifying round at Beijing in 2015.  Matthews ran for University of Technology, Jamaica.

International competitions

References

1989 births
Living people
Jamaican male sprinters
People from Manchester Parish
World Athletics Championships athletes for Jamaica
Olympic athletes of Jamaica
Athletes (track and field) at the 2016 Summer Olympics
Olympic silver medalists for Jamaica
Olympic silver medalists in athletics (track and field)
Medalists at the 2016 Summer Olympics
Universiade medalists in athletics (track and field)
Athletes (track and field) at the 2018 Commonwealth Games
Commonwealth Games medallists in athletics
Commonwealth Games bronze medallists for Jamaica
Universiade silver medalists for Jamaica
Medalists at the 2011 Summer Universiade
20th-century Jamaican people
21st-century Jamaican people
Medallists at the 2018 Commonwealth Games